Events in the year 2014 in South Korea.

Incumbents
 President: Park Geun-hye
 Prime Minister: Jung Hong-won

Events

January

February
 February 6 – Kim and Chae are rescued from the Sinan County salt farms.
 February 17 – A building collapse at a mountain resort in Gyeongju kills ten people.

March
 March 11 – The Canada–South Korea Free Trade Agreement is signed by Stephen Harper, the Prime Minister of Canada, and Park Geun-hye, the President of South Korea.

April
 April 8 – The Australia–Korea Free Trade Agreement is signed by the Australian Prime Minister Tony Abbott and South Korean President Park Geun-hye
 April 16 – A ferry carrying 476 people capsizes and sinks off the South Korean coast, killing at least 262 people and leaving 40 others missing.

May
 May 2 – The 2014 Seoul subway crash occurred.
 May 12 – ITX saemaeul was started operation

June
 June 4 – The 2014 South Korean local elections are held.

July
 July 16 – A fire incident aboard the train at Busan Metro in the South Korean port city of Busan with five people injured and 100 people were evacuated.
 July 17 – A firefighting helicopter searching for missing people from the sinking of MV Sewol in April crashes in the South Korean city of Gwangju with five people aboard.
 July 30 – 2014 South Korean by-elections

August
 2014 South Korea floods

September
 September 3 – Ladies' Code was involved in an accident at Yeongdong Expressway leading to deaths of members EunB and RiSe.
 September 19 – The Asian Games take place in Incheon, South Korea.

October
 October 17 – Pangyo Techno Valley Vents Collapse

November

December
 December 5 – Korean Air flight 086 was returned to gate at JFK airport because vice-president of Korean Air and a passenger aboard the plane, Heather Cho, became enraged about Macadamia service. As a result, the flight arrived at Incheon International Airport 11 minutes late.

Films

 19th Busan International Film Festival
 51st Grand Bell Awards
 1st Wildflower Film Awards
 35th Blue Dragon Film Awards

Television

 3rd APAN Star Awards
 2014 KBS Drama Awards
 7th Korea Drama Awards
 2014 MBC Drama Awards
 2014 SBS Drama Awards

Music

 List of number-one hits of 2014
 List of Gaon Album Chart number ones of 2014
 List of number-one Streaming Songs of 2014
 2014 Mnet Asian Music Awards

Sports
 April 20–26 – 2014 IIHF World Championship Division I (Group A)
 July 18–26 – South Korea finish top of the table at the 2014 IPC Shooting World Championships winning ten gold medals from 27 events.
 September 19 – October 4 – 2014 Asian Games

Deaths
 September -  Kim Song-ae, 89, president (Former of First Lady Of North Korea)
 September 3 – Go Eun-bi, 21, singer (Ladies' Code)
 September 7 – Kwon Rise, 23, singer (Ladies' Code)
 October 27 – Shin Hae-chul, 46, singer-songwriter, producer, artist, activist (N.EX.T)

References

 
2010s in South Korea
Years of the 21st century in South Korea
South Korea
South Korea